Pounded yam or Iyán (Yoruba) is a Nigerian swallow food native to the Yoruba, Igbo, Ebira and Tiv ethnic groups. It is a traditional food. It is prepared by pounding boiled yam with a mortar and pestle. Pounded yam is similar to mashed potatoes but heavier. It is a smooth and tasty delicacy traditionally eaten with the hands. Although there is a alternative for Pounded Yam which is called Poundo Yam, the Pounded Yam still remains to be the favorite of most Nigerians.

Iyán is consumed in Ondo State, Ijesha, Edo, Benue and Ekiti in Nigeria, among others. It can be served with egusi, soup, jute leaves soup (ewedu), stewed spinach (efo riro) or okra soup.

Preparation of íyàn 
The items needed to make pounded yam are puna yam, water, and a mortar and pestle. Peel the yam and cut it into small cubes, rinse, then boil for about 30 minutes until it is soft. Clean the mortar and pestle by washing with water, pound the yam until soft, smooth and dough-like. in some parts of the Nigeria they add eba to the pounded yam when it's a paste to give it more flayour and harden it. 

Dry yam harvested later in the season will require more water while fresh yam harvested earlier will require less water during pounding. Eat íyán when it is hot and freshly served.

Types of yam 

The type of yam used for pounding yam is the African yam which is common in  Africa and some parts of Asia. It is also known as puna yam, true yam or white yam. The texture is rough with brown skin and off-white flesh; its length ranges from that of regular potatoes up to five feet long.

Puna yam is a food/cash crop  available all year round unlike other crops that are seasonal. Other varieties of yam include purple yam, wild yam, white guinea yam, Chinese and water yam.

African yam is rich in carbohydrates and calories. Although it lacks protein, it can be balanced with egg and sauce.

Varieties of soup for pounded yam

Pounded yam goes with okro soup, ẹ̀fọ́ rírò, banga soup (ofe akwu), ogbono and gbẹ̀gìrì soup. The food is popularly eaten with egusi soup, a tasty stew made from ground melon seeds, tomatoes, onion and red palm oil.

See also
 Eba
 Fufu
 Amala
 List of African dishes
 Nigerian cuisine

References

External links
pounded yam from Allnigeria foods

Central African cuisine
Yoruba cuisine
Igbo cuisine
Nigerian cuisine
Staple foods
Swallows (food)
Nigeria
Africa